Myolisa is a monotypic snout moth genus. Its one species, Myolisa chattinis, was described by Harrison Gray Dyar Jr. in 1914. It is found in Mexico.

References

Moths described in 1914
Chrysauginae
Monotypic moth genera
Moths of Central America
Pyralidae genera